Saint Valerius is the name of:

Valerius of Saragossa (died 315), patron saint of Zaragoza
Valerius of Trèves (died 320), semi-legendary bishop of Trier
Valerius and Rufinus (died 287), martyrs